Diaphus parini is a species of lanternfish found in the Southeast Pacific Ocean.

Etymology
The fish is named  in honor of ichthyologist Nikolai Vasilyevich Parin (1932–2012), of the Russian Academy of Sciences.

References

Myctophidae
Taxa named by Vladimir Eduardovich Becker
Fish described in 1992